is an airport located  south of Obihiro Station in Obihiro, Hokkaidō, Japan.

Airlines and destinations

History
The airport opened in March, 1981, initially with a  runway, taking over the role of the former Obihiro Airport, now Tokachi Airfield.

Statistics

References

External links

  
Terminal Building

Airports in Hokkaido
Airports established in 1981
1981 establishments in Japan